held every year since 1968, the Quest Conference is an annual gathering of pagan practitioners, authors and interested newcomers in the Bristol area of the UK. It is organised by Marian Green, editor of Quest
 and the author of over twenty books on witchcraft, magic and the Western Mysteries.

The meetings were initially held in London, and in 1983 attracted about 100 people to a venue in Russell Square. The 2012 meeting was held at the Southville Centre in Bristol, and included talks by medieval historian Karen Ralls on Roslyn Chapel, and herbalist Val Thomas on creating a magical garden. The 2013 meeting was also held at the Southville Centre and included talks by Rae Beth on witchcraft and the otherworld and Philip West on the pagan roots of the Old Testament.

References

External links

Modern paganism in the United Kingdom
Annual events in the United Kingdom
Conferences in the United Kingdom
1968 establishments in the United Kingdom
Recurring events established in 1968
1960s in modern paganism